Giovanni Sartori (born 31 March 1957) is an Italian football official and a former professional player who currently works as technical director of Bologna.

He scored 43 goals from 217 appearances in the Italian professional leagues, which included 7 appearances without scoring in the 1978–79 Serie A season for A.C. Milan, winning the championship with the team.

He was the director of sports for ChievoVerona from 1992 to 2014, and then joined Atalanta as technical director.

He was fined €15,000 for his involvement in the 2006 false accounting scandal.

In 2021, he was inducted into the Italian Football Hall of Fame.

References

1957 births
Living people
People from Lodi, Lombardy
Italian footballers
Association football forwards
Serie A players
A.C. Milan players
Venezia F.C. players
Udinese Calcio players
U.C. Sampdoria players
S.S. Arezzo players
Ternana Calcio players
A.C. ChievoVerona players
Serie B players
Footballers from Lombardy
Sportspeople from the Province of Lodi